Baralaba is a rural town and locality in the Shire of Banana in central Queensland, Australia.

Geography
The Dawson River forms the western boundary of the locality. The town is located in the north-west corner of the locality beside the river. The Neville Hewitt weir on the river at the town creates a wide river for irrigation and recreation.

History
The town's name is derived from an Aboriginal word meaning "high mountain" referring to nearby Mount Ramsay.

Baralaba Provisional School opened on 19 August 1918. It became a state school on 1 March 1922. In 1964, a secondary department was added.

Baralaba Post Office opened by April 1924 (a receiving office had been open since about 1919).

Lily State School opened in 1925 and closed circa 1927.

In May 1941, an Honour Board commemorating those who served in World War II was unveiled at the Returned and Services League of Australia Memorial Hall in Stopford Street. Outside of the Memorial Hall is a white cross commemorating those who served in all wars and conflicts.

Two coal mines once operated in the Baralaba region. Both closed, but mining operations recommenced at one mine in 2005.

The mobile library service commenced in 2004.

Heritage listings 
Baralaba has a number of heritage-listed sites, including:
 Morgan Street and The Esplanade: Dawson Valley Colliery

Economy 

The local economy revolves around beef production and more recently coal mining.

Education 

Baralaba P-10 State School is a government primary and secondary (Prep-10) school for boys and girls at 1 Power Street. In 2017, the school had an enrolment of 90 students with 12 teachers (9 full-time equivalent) and 15 non-teaching staff (9 full-time equivalent).
 
The nearest secondary schools offering Years 11 and 12 are located in Moura and Biloela.

Amenities
Baralaba Golf Club has a 9-hole golf course and is located on Alberta Road.

Banana Shire Council operate  a fortnightly mobile library service to Baralaba.

Baralaba Uniting Church is at 43 Power Street; the Anglican and Catholic churches are also in Power Street.

Events
Every March, there is a campdrafting competition at Baralaba.

The annual Baralaba agricultural show is held in May, while the Saratoga Fishing Competition is held each September.

References

External links

University of Queensland: Queensland Places: Baralaba
Banana Shire Council
Town map of Baralba, 1980

 
Towns in Queensland
Mining towns in Queensland
Shire of Banana
World War II memorials in Queensland
Localities in Queensland